The 1955 World Ninepin Bowling Classic Championships was the second edition of the championships and was held in Essen, West Germany, from 30 August to 5 September 1955.

In the men's competition the title was won by East Germany in the team competition and by Eberhard Luther (East Germany) in the individual event. In the women's competition the title was won by East Germany in the team competition and by Francka Erjavec (Yugoslavia) in the individual event.
Czechoslovakia entered its first championship and earned a bronze medal in the men's team event.

Participating teams

Men 
 
 
 
 
  Saar

Women

Results

Men - team 

The competition was played with 200 throws mixed (100 full, 100 clean). Teams were composed of 6 competitors and the scores were added up.

|}

Women - team 
The competition was played with 100 throws mixed (50 full, 50 clean). Teams were composed of 6 competitors and the scores were added up.

|}

Men - individual

Women - individual

Medal summary

Medal table

Men

Women

References 
 WC Archive on KZS
 WC History on WNBA NBC

World Ninepin Bowling Classic Championships
1955 in bowling
1955 in German sport
International sports competitions hosted by Germany
Sport in Essen